Zhang Rui is the name of:

Zhang Rui (table tennis, born 1979), Chinese table tennis player who represented Hong Kong
Zhang Rui (table tennis, born 1997), Chinese table tennis player
Zhang Rui (footballer) (born 1989), Chinese association footballer